St Mary's Roman Catholic Church is a heritage-listed church precinct at Mary Street, Woodend, Ipswich, City of Ipswich, Queensland, Australia. It was built from 1874 to 1970s. It is also known as the former St Brigids Convent. It was added to the Queensland Heritage Register on 21 October 1992.

History 

The first Catholic church in Ipswich was established about 1849 on the corner of Mary Street and Elizabeth Street. It was made of slab and shingles.

On Monday 25 October 1858, Archbishop of Sydney John Bede Polding laid the foundation stone for a new stone church. The first mass was conducted on Sunday 4 December 1860 by Reverend W. McGinty, but the consecration of the church had to await the arrival of the first Bishop of Brisbane, James Quinn.

The first presbytery, a timber cottage, was built in 1860, but by the 1870s was in extremely poor condition. The congregation of St Mary's and the parish priest at the time, Father Andrew Horan, agreed to build a more substantial building. The present presbytery, built in 1876, was designed by the Italian architect Andrea Stombuco who had moved to Brisbane in 1875. This structure is the oldest building in the St Mary's Precinct. The Neo-Classical style building was built of stone and plastered inside and out with Portland cement.

Description 
St Mary's Presbytery is a two storeyed stone building constructed in the manner of an Italian villa, to the design of the architect Andrea Stombuco. It is rectangular in plan with a stair hall leading to four rooms at each level.

Heritage listing 
St Mary's Roman Catholic Church Precinct was listed on the Queensland Heritage Register on 21 October 1992 having satisfied the following criteria.

The place is important in demonstrating the evolution or pattern of Queensland's history.

This extensive precinct was established in the late 1850s as the central site of the Roman Catholic Church in Ipswich. Development of St Mary's Catholic Church Complex reflects the principal phases of development and growth in Ipswich, particularly during the nineteenth and early twentieth centuries.

The place is important in demonstrating the principal characteristics of a particular class of cultural places.

The complex is a good and substantially intact example of a nineteenth and early twentieth century Roman Catholic Complex with a prominent church, presbytery, parish hall, school buildings and convent. The prominence of the site and architectural quality of the buildings make this a particularly good example of an ecclesiastical precinct in Queensland.

The place is important because of its aesthetic significance.

St Mary's Complex is a landmark in Ipswich and has, for this reason, considerable aesthetic and social value. The site has a number of significant buildings and elements which, individually, have aesthetic and architectural value. St Mary's Church is a good and substantial example of early twentieth century Gothic Revival churches. The presbytery is a fine example of building designed in the Italian villa style, appropriate to the sub tropical climate of Brisbane. Further this building is important as a good example of the work of the renowned Catholic architect, Andrea Giovanni Stombuco. The school buildings, parish hall and convent are also fine buildings of considerable architectural merit.

The place has a strong or special association with a particular community or cultural group for social, cultural or spiritual reasons.

St Mary's Catholic Church is significant for its association with Father Andrew Horan, Parish Priest of St Mary's from 1872 to 1924. Father Horan supervised construction of the church and is buried and commemorated inside the church.

The place has a special association with the life or work of a particular person, group or organisation of importance in Queensland's history.

St Mary's Catholic Church is significant for its association with Father Andrew Horan, Parish Priest of St Mary's from 1872 to 1924. Father Horan supervised construction of the church and is buried and commemorated inside the church.

References

Attribution

Further reading

External links

 

Queensland Heritage Register
Ipswich, Queensland
Roman Catholic churches in Queensland
Articles incorporating text from the Queensland Heritage Register
19th-century Roman Catholic church buildings in Australia
20th-century Roman Catholic church buildings in Australia